West Point Lake is a man-made reservoir located mostly in west-central Georgia on the Chattahoochee River and maintained by the U.S. Army Corps of Engineers (USACE). The Chattahoochee river flows in from the north, before flowing through the West Point Dam, which impounds the lake, and continuing to Columbus, Georgia. The purposes of the reservoir are to provide flood control, hydroelectric power, and water storage to aid the navigation of the lower Chattahoochee.

History

Authorized by the Flood Control Act of 1962, West Point Lake was built for several purposes and cost an estimated $105 million. Two major uses of the lake prescribed are power generation and recreation. The smaller percentage uses are: flood control, Fish and Wildlife, Area Redevelopment, and Navigation. In the master plan, it was decided to have a  buffer from the water edge.

After being approved in 1964, construction began in 1965 with the west embankment and powerhouse access road being completed first in 1966. Also in 1966, a team discovered sites of archaeological significance and important sites were studied until 1971 before the lake was filled. When the lake was flooded, the floodplain would contain two historic covered bridges that would be inundated. The Wehadkee Creek bridge was privately salvaged in 1965 and relocated to Callaway Gardens while Glass' bridge was burned in 1954 as it was the only efficient means of destruction.

The main channel was closed in May 1967 and diverted through the east bank. The dam itself began construction in May 1968 and was later completed in August 1970. The next closure was on June 21, 1973, as the river was routed through an opening for a future generator. The first generator was completed in May 1974; however, diking problems did not allow filling of the lake to begin until October 16, 1974. Due to continuing construction, the lake would not be allowed to fill any higher until April 30, 1975, after another power unit was completed.

A major factor in building West Point Lake was navigation. After building West Point Lake, it was decided to raise the winter pool from  aMSL. Before this, Walter F. George Lake and West Point Lake could not both be filled to their summer pools by the end of May without sacrificing water flow downstream and starving the Apalachicola River of needed water for navigation. This was not done earlier out of fear of flooding downstream during heavy rain periods.

West Point Dam
West Point Dam is a (LxHxD) concrete dam completed in 1975. During construction, rock was excavated should West Point need to add a navigable lock in the future to the right bank.

Location and surroundings
West Point Lake is within  of many semi-major cities in Georgia and Alabama. In Georgia it has: Columbus, LaGrange, Newnan, Peachtree City, Carrollton and some parts of Atlanta. In Alabama it has: Phenix City, Opelika-Auburn, and Roanoke. Both sides of the lake are easily accessible from their respective sides, however crossing the lake can prove challenging as there are only two bridges that cross the main channel. Without crossing directly over the lake, one must go to Franklin or West Point to cross the river. At times, the West Point Dam can be crossed for a slightly shorter southern path.

Wildlife and flora

When West Point Lake was filled, habitats for deer, dove, quail, and waterfowl were lost which caused important migratory bird routes to be disturbed. An endangered species, the Bald eagle, is frequently seen in this part of the lake. There are many animals, including some harmful to humans, in and around the area. Two snakes known to the area that are venomous are the copperhead and cottonmouth. There are a few species of plants and animals that are tracked and knowingly occur in the area of West Point Lake. Three fish in this list are the bluestripe shiner, southern brook lamprey, and the highscale shiner. Only one bird is on this tracked list, the bachman's sparrow, along with 19 plants that include a sunflower, azalea, and a strawberry plant. Many types of common animals found in the southeastern United States are also found in the West Point Lake area including different species of bass, crappie, waterfowl, snakes, and turtles. The American alligator has been spotted in the area however very rare. With the wildlife previously mentioned, West Point Lake is a location where one has the ability to partake in hunting, fishing, shooting, and general wildlife viewing.

Access and recreation

Access
There are four types of access, known as shoreline allocations, at West Point Lake.

 Limited Development  Private floating facilities and some land activities may be authorized such as a dock or improved walkway and requires a permit from the USACE.
 Protected  Contrary to limited development, private docks are prohibited unless grandfathered in. This area is a buffer meant to protect aesthetics, habitats, conflicts, and more between areas and was designed to comply with the National Environmental Policy Act.
The main area is close to the West Point Dam to protect boats and life from danger.
 Public Recreation  This area is for past or present public use and private use is prohibited. This is the largest single allocation of West Point Lake.
 
West Point Lake has the highest shoreline mileage and percentage of total shoreline miles allocated to public recreation areas of all USACE lakes in the ACF river basin. Thus making West Point Lake the most publicly accessible USACE lake in the basin. In addition to the large available public areas, the land buffer around the lake, regardless of allocation, is considered public land. With the exception of personal property (a boat dock) and the prohibited areas, the public is allowed anywhere on this buffer as an issued permit does not allow private exclusive rights anywhere on USACE property.

Recreation
In 2016, West Point Lake recorded 36 parks, 2 marinas, and 7 campgrounds. West Point Lake does not have its recreational areas concentrated in any one area of the lake, however, a large percentage of shoreline south of Georgia State Route 109 is public access. During the first three years of operation, there were only 26 parks available for a total of  but annual visitation increased yearly from one million in 1976 to 4.2 million by 1981. Later, visitation numbers were affected greatly as water pollution increased from nearby Atlanta. Visitation numbers are unknown today, however many flock to lake during the annual fireworks display at Pyne Road Park that are accessible by boat or land.

Watershed and geology
The northern portion of the river basin is in the Blue Ridge Region, but the middle region, where West Point is located, is in the Piedmont Region, north of the fall line. This produces rolling hills around the lake with the exception of the nearby Pine Mountain Range. The lake and other parts of the region contains soils with high iron-oxides and are clay-rich that make Georgia famous. Granite and soapstone are common minerals in area. The entire area of the Chattahoochee River basin is

Pollution

The lake is sometimes criticized and brought into negative public light due to being the first impoundment south of Atlanta. Scientists were strongly attracted to West Point Lake for this reason and were eager to study the lake and the river. Studies were done in the early 1990s in detail to determine the effects of the urban environment on the lake.

Pre-lawsuit
Starting in the late 1970s, the lake was beginning to have water quality issues, which affected lake usership and eventually caused local economic damage. On 19 July 1988, the water being released from the lake downstream had become eutrophic and thus killing fish in the river. In February 1991, the GA Department of Natural Resources issued a fish consumption advisory for the lake, which extended downstream to Lake Harding on March 3.

Also in 1991, as pollution damage was realized, the Georgia Environmental Protection Division (GEPD) and the City of Atlanta made a timetable to reduce phosphorus by the late 1990s. Atlanta continually failed to reduce pollution and was threatened by the GEPD with fines and sewer bans.  This had the ability to damage the economics around the 1996 Olympic Games and further increase the amount of daily fines by $10,000. The daily fines were already at $9,000 per day and had totalled $20 million by 1997 for failing to complete sewer overflow treatment systems.

Lawsuit to today
On October 10, 1995, the Upper Chattahoochee Riverkeepers filed a lawsuit against the City of Atlanta for violation of the Clean Water Act by not upgrading facilities to meet standards. 
In 1998, two Federal Consent Decrees were ordered for the City of Atlanta to address its under-maintained wastewater system. In addressing the issues, a program was created at a cost of $4 billion that removed over 400 million gallons a year of sewer drainage into the rivers.  In another part of the lawsuit, the City of Atlanta was issued a $2.5 million fine and volunteered to remove trash and establish greenways.

In 1998, an investigation for polychlorinated biphenyls(PCBs) was completed and found fish contaminated. However this data is slightly misleading as Georgia does not use PCBs anymore thus contaminated fish are older from previous years. As of 2012, 97 percent of sewage from the 1990s was removed and expected to keep improving. In 2015 and 2017, bacteria levels were tested and published in the media showing normal and safe levels. The lake is tested regularly to the United States Environmental Protection Agency standards, results are posted for public view, and court admissible.

Climate
Many factors affect the lake and its basin. West Point Lake is in the southern end of the temperate zone and close to both the Atlantic Ocean and the Gulf of Mexico which can bring tropical storms and hurricanes to the area. Thunderstorms produce much of the rainfall during the summer months as well as frontal systems. Flood inducing storms are most likely to occur in the area during winter and early spring as fronts. During the summer, convective thunderstorms are the leading source of rainfall with the occasional tropical storm. Snowfall can occur but rarely covers the ground for more than a few days.

References

External links
West Point Lake - US Army Corps of Engineers
West Point Lake News, Information, Lake Levels, Weather and more

LWestPoint
Protected areas of Chambers County, Alabama
Bodies of water of Chambers County, Alabama
Chattahoochee River
Protected areas of Heard County, Georgia
West Point
Protected areas of Troup County, Georgia
Dams in Georgia (U.S. state)
United States Army Corps of Engineers dams
Bodies of water of Heard County, Georgia
Bodies of water of Troup County, Georgia